Shrouds of the Night is a book from the astronomy genre.

Overview
The book was written at the Mount Stromlo Observatory in 2007 by David Block and Ken Freeman.  It is a timetable of astronomical photography from 1826 to the present day.

History
Much of the content of this book is published here for the first time.  Two examples of this are: one from Arizona's Lowell Observatory and another from the Royal Astronomical Society of London.

Notes

2007 non-fiction books
Astronomy books